Major Abraham Nicholas (died Sunday, September 3, 1738) served as mayor of Williamsburg, Virginia from 1735 to 1736. He married a woman named Ann and had at least one son, Abraham Nicholas who died on March 5, 1751.

Nicholas was the first Adjutant-General of the Virginia Colony from 1 November 1728, until his death ten years later. (Succeeded by Isham Randolph, appointed Adjutant-General by Governor William Gooch, who was approved by the Council on 9 November 1738.)

References 

Year of birth unknown
1738 deaths
Abraham Nicholas
Mayors of Williamsburg, Virginia
Virginia colonial people